Lois Arlene Smith (née Humbert; born November 3, 1930) is an American character actress whose career spans eight decades. She made her film debut in the 1955 drama film East of Eden, and later played supporting roles in a number of movies, including Five Easy Pieces (1970), Resurrection (1980), Fatal Attraction (1987), Fried Green Tomatoes (1991), Falling Down (1993), How to Make an American Quilt (1995), Dead Man Walking (1995), Twister (1996), Minority Report (2002), The Nice Guys (2016), Lady Bird (2017), and The French Dispatch (2021).

In 2017, Smith received critical acclaim for her leading performance in the science-fiction drama film Marjorie Prime, for which she was nominated for an Independent Spirit Awards, Gotham Awards and Saturn Award, and won a Satellite Award. She has also had many roles on daytime and primetime television. She was a regular cast member in the HBO horror drama True Blood, and received a Critics' Choice Television Award for Best Guest Performer in a Drama Series nomination for The Americans.

Smith also is known for her extensive work in the theatre. A three-time Tony Award nominee, she won the 2020 Tony Award for Best Featured Actress in a Play for her performance in The Inheritance, becoming the oldest performer to win a Tony Award for acting. She also received Tony nominations for her performances in The Grapes of Wrath (1990) and Buried Child (1996). She starred in an acclaimed Off-Broadway revival of The Trip to Bountiful in 2005 for which she received an Obie Award for Best Actress, an Outer Critics Circle Award, a Lucille Lortel Award, and a Drama Desk Award. She is an ensemble member of Steppenwolf Theatre Company in Chicago.

She was inducted into the American Theatre Hall of Fame in 2007 for her outstanding contributions to the theatre. In 2013, she received a Lifetime Achievement Obie Award for excellence in Off-Broadway performances. She has taught, directed, and written for the stage.

Personal life
Smith was born Lois Arlene Humbert in Topeka, Kansas, the youngest of six children of Carrie (née Gottshalk) and William Humbert, who worked for a telephone company. Her father died in 1950 at age 54. Her family included her two sisters, Alice and Marvelle, and three brothers, William, Dilman, and Phillip, all of whom are now deceased. Her father moved the family to Seattle when Lois was 11 years old, and he was involved heavily in the church, staging plays there in which young Lois performed. She studied theatre at the University of Washington but did not graduate. At age 18, she married Wesley Dale Smith, whom she met in college; they divorced in 1970. They had one daughter, Moon Elizabeth Smith.

Around 1951, Smith and her husband decided to leave Seattle for New York City to begin their professional careers. After she worked with Elia Kazan on East of Eden, he encouraged her to study with Lee Strasberg at the Actors Studio, which she did. She was also mentored in her early years in New York City by John Van Druten.

Career

Theatre
Smith made her Broadway debut in 1952 at age 22 in the play Time Out for Ginger as Joan, with Nancy Malone as Ginger and Melvyn Douglas as their father. She followed this in 1955 with The Wisteria Trees, a play that starred Helen Hayes. In 1956, she performed with Hayes in The Glass Menagerie. Also in 1955, she was given the lead role of Josephine Perry in Sally Benson's play The Young and Beautiful, which ran for 65 performances at the Longacre Theatre.

In 1957, Smith originated the role of Carol Cutrere in Orpheus Descending by Tennessee Williams, which also starred Maureen Stapleton. In 1958, she was directed by José Ferrer in Edwin Booth.

From 1965 to 1967, Smith starred in several plays as a company member with the Theatre of the Living Arts in Philadelphia with Andre Gregory. She is a lifetime member of Ensemble Studio Theatre, founded by Curt Dempster in 1968.

In 1973, she returned to Broadway to appear in a revival of The Iceman Cometh by Eugene O'Neill. In 1975, she performed the role of Gaby in Corinne Jacker's play Harry Outside. She also played the lead female role in Steve Tesich's play Touching Bottoms in 1978. In 1979, she played the role of Denise in Elizabeth Stearns's play Hillbilly Women at the Long Wharf Theatre. In 1987, she played Jessie Bliss in Darrah Cloud's The Stick Wife with the Hartford Stage Company.

In 1988, Smith was cast with the Steppenwolf Theatre Company of Chicago as Ma Joad in the play The Grapes of Wrath, an adaptation of the 1939 Steinbeck novel. Smith originated the stage role, and after going on tour, the production reached Broadway in 1990 and Smith earned a Tony Award nomination for Best Featured Actress in a Play.

Also in 1988, Smith originated the role of Mrs. Campbell in Horton Foote's The Man Who Climbed the Pecan Trees. In 1989, she played Mistress Overdone in an Off-Broadway production of William Shakespeare's Measure for Measure.

Smith has been an ensemble member of the Steppenwolf Theatre Company since 1993. She is a lifetime member of Ensemble Studio Theatre, founded by Curt Dempster in 1968.

In 1995, Smith starred as Halie in a revival of Buried Child by Sam Shepard at the Steppenwolf Theatre Company that transferred to Broadway in 1996, and for which she received her second nomination for the Tony Award for Best Featured Actress in a Play. In 1997, Smith played the role of Betty in Defying Gravity by Jane Anderson Off-Broadway. In 1998, she played Kandall Kingsley in Beth Henley's Impossible Marriage. In 2001, she starred in the title role of Mother Courage and Her Children, and in 2002 she starred as Fanny Cavendish in a revival of The Royal Family, both with the Steppenwolf Theatre Company.

In 2005, Smith starred in an Off-Broadway production of The Trip to Bountiful as Carrie Watts with the Signature Theatre Company, for which she received an Obie Award for Best Actress, an Outer Critics Circle Award, a Lucille Lortel Award, and a Drama Desk Award.

In 2010, Smith played Vera in Amy Herzog's After the Revolution, for which she was nominated for a Lucille Lortel Award. In 2012 she originated the role of Mable Murphy in Sam Shepard's play Heartless, and in 2013, she starred in a revival of Horton Foote's My Old Friends. In 2014, she starred in a new play by Jordan Harrison, Marjorie Prime, originating the title role at the Mark Taper Forum. She was featured in Annie Baker's play John, which opened Off-Broadway at the Signature Theatre Company on July 22, 2015, and ran to September 6.

In 2018 she took on the leading role in Brooklyn College student Lily Thorne's Peace for Mary Frances. The drama, directed by Lila Neugebauer, was given its world premiere by off-Broadway's The New Group at the Pershing Square Signature Center in New York. Smith's performance was praised, but the play received negative reviews from a variety of outlets from The New York Times to The Hollywood Reporter and The Wrap.

Film

Smith made her film debut in 1955 directed by Elia Kazan in the drama film East of Eden with James Dean, Julie Harris, and Jo Van Fleet. Her next film was the western Strange Lady in Town. In November 1955, she was featured on the cover of Life Magazine. Smith then focused on television work, not making a film until The Way We Live Now in 1970. She then earned critical acclaim for her role as Partita Dupea, the sister of Jack Nicholson's character in Five Easy Pieces (1970), and Smith won the National Society of Film Critics Award for Best Supporting Actress.

Supporting roles in films in the 1970s and 1980s included Up the Sandbox, Next Stop, Greenwich Village, Resurrection, Foxes, Four Friends, Reuben, Reuben, Reckless, Black Widow, Fatal Attraction, and Midnight Run.

Supporting roles in the 1990s and 2000s included Green Card, Fried Green Tomatoes, How to Make an American Quilt, Falling Down, Holy Matrimony, Dead Man Walking, Twister, Tumbleweeds, The Pledge, Minority Report, P.S., Sweet Land, Hollywoodland, and Killshot. In the 2010s, Smith played supporting roles in Please Give, The Nice Guys, The Comedian, and the documentary The Gettysburg Address.

In 2017, Smith appeared in the science-fiction drama film Marjorie Prime, for which she won the Satellite Award for Best Supporting Actress at the 22nd ceremony. Later that year, she had a supporting role in the critically acclaimed comedy-drama Lady Bird, receiving a Screen Actors Guild Award for Outstanding Performance by a Cast in a Motion Picture nomination. She was later cast in The French Dispatch, a drama film written and directed by Wes Anderson.

Television
Smith made her television debut in 1953 on Kraft Television Theatre. In 1954, she appeared as the daughter of Mary Astor in a Studio One production. She performed on many series through the 1950s and 1960s, guest-starring on Naked City, The Doctors, Dr. Kildare, and The Defenders. In 1956, she appeared with John Cassavetes in Bring Me a Dream, a teleplay by John Vlahos, and she appeared as Felicia in Noon on Doomsday, written by Rod Serling. In 1959, she was given the lead role of Cindy in the teleplay Cindy's Fella, a modernized version of Cinderella, with James Stewart and directed by Gower Champion.

In 1960, she performed in The Master Builder as Hilda and as Julie in Miss Julie in public television specials. Also in 1960, she appeared as Lena in a teleplay based on Victory by Joseph Conrad, and in a teleplay version of Men In White by Sidney Kingsley as Barbara Dennin. She did four episodes of Route 66, and in 1967 performed in Do Not Go Gentle into That Good Night on CBS Playhouse with Shirley Booth. In 1970, she performed with Kim Stanley in a television special of Tennessee Williams's plays, Dragon Country.

In 1978, Smith played the lead role of Stacey MacAindra in the teleplay Stacey based on Margaret Laurence's The Fire Dwellers. In 1980, she appeared in the television film The Jilting of Granny Weatherall as the daughter of Geraldine Fitzgerald, and in 1981 played Bertha in a television film version of The House of Mirth.

She played supporting roles in the Emmy-nominated TV films Rage of Angels (1983), The Execution of Raymond Graham (1985), Switched at Birth (1991) and Skylark (1993). She guest-starred on two episodes of The Equalizer and one episode of Thirtysomething in 1991.

In 1991, she portrayed Alice, the mother of Thelma Todd, in White Hot: The Mysterious Murder of Thelma Todd and in 1995 portrayed Margaret, the mother of Bess Truman in the Emmy-winning television film Truman. She guest-starred on episodes of The Practice, Frasier, Just Shoot Me!, Touched by an Angel, Cold Case and Law & Order.

In 2002, Smith appeared in The Laramie Project and in 2004 she portrayed Anna Howard Shaw in the Emmy-winning film Iron Jawed Angels. In 2007, she guest-starred on four episodes of ER and in 2009 in A Dog Year with Jeff Bridges. She played Adele Stackhouse, the grandmother of Anna Paquin's character on True Blood and played the mother-in-law of Felicity Huffman's character on Desperate Housewives.

In 2015, Smith was nominated for a Critics' Choice Television Award for Best Guest Performer for her role in an episode of The Americans. In 2017 she guest-starred in "The Gun", episode five of the third season of the Netflix series Grace and Frankie, as Mrs. Hanson, the vituperative mother of Martin Sheen's character Robert. Also in 2017, she guest-starred in "In the Pink", episode 4 of season 4 of Younger, as Belinda Lacroix, a Barbara Cartland-type romance novelist. In 2019, she guest-starred in Mom as Claire, Bonnie and Tammy's former caretaker at the old foster home.

Soap opera fans have seen Smith on daytime in many recurring and guest-starring roles over the years, as the psychotic wife Zoe Cannell on Somerset (1972–1974), Eleanor Conrad on The Doctors (1975–1977), Ella Fitz (the co-conspirator of evil Alma Rudder) on Another World (1982–1983), Mrs. Oakes on The Edge of Night (1983), Elwinna Pendergast on All My Children, and as Dorian's imperious aunt Betsy Cramer on One Life to Live (2003–2004).

Filmography

Film

Television

Theatre

Broadway

Off Broadway

Awards and nominations

References

External links
 
 
 

1930 births
Living people
Actresses from Kansas
Actresses from Seattle
American film actresses
American stage actresses
American television actresses
Drama Desk Award winners
Actors from Topeka, Kansas
University of Washington School of Drama alumni
20th-century American actresses
21st-century American actresses
Steppenwolf Theatre Company players
Tony Award winners